Prorella mellisa is a moth in the family Geometridae first described by John Arthur Grossbeck in 1908. It is found in the US states of California, Arizona, Colorado and Montana.

The forewings have a slight ocherous suffusion. Adults have been recorded on wing in May and from July to October.

References

Eupitheciini
Moths of North America
Fauna of the Sierra Nevada (United States)
Moths described in 1908